Ramadhani Athumani Maneno is a Tanzanian CCM politician and Member of Parliament for Chalinze constituency in the National Assembly of Tanzania since 2005.

References

Living people
Chama Cha Mapinduzi MPs
Tanzanian MPs 2005–2010
Year of birth missing (living people)
Place of birth missing (living people)